Marco Tumminello   (born 6 November 1998) is an Italian footballer who plays for Italian  club Gelbison on loan from Crotone, as a striker.

Club career
Tumminello is a youth product from A.S. Roma. He made his Serie A debut on 6 January 2016 against Chievo Verona, replacing Alessandro Florenzi in extra time.

On 31 August 2017, Tumminiello joined Crotone on a season-long loan deal.

On 22 June 2018, Tumminello signed a contract with Serie A side Atalanta.

On 28 January 2019 he was loaned to Serie B club Lecce.

On 20 July 2019, Tumminello joined Pescara on loan until 30 June 2020. After starting the season on a hot streak with 2 goals in 3 games, Tumminello suffered Anterior cruciate ligament injury which forced him to miss most of the season. He was originally expected to return in April 2020, but did not appear in any more games for Pescara.

On 22 January 2021, Tumminello joined SPAL on loan with option to buy until the end of the season.

Tumminello joined Serie B club Reggina on a season-long loan on 17 August 2021.

On 17 August 2022, Tumminello returned to Crotone (now in Serie C) on a four-year contract. On 19 January 2023, Tumminello was loaned by Gelbison.

International career 
He made his debut with the Italy U21 squad on 6 September 2019, scoring a goal in the friendly match won 4–0 against Moldova.

Career statistics

References

1998 births
People from Erice
Sportspeople from the Province of Trapani
Footballers from Sicily
Living people
Italian footballers
Italy youth international footballers
Italy under-21 international footballers
Association football forwards
A.S. Roma players
F.C. Crotone players
Atalanta B.C. players
U.S. Lecce players
Delfino Pescara 1936 players
S.P.A.L. players
Reggina 1914 players
Serie A players
Serie B players
Serie C players